Dhirdan is a village in Lunkaransar tehsil of Bikaner district in Rajasthan, India. Village is known for Baba Sheikh Farid's Chilla.

References

Bikaner district
Villages in Bikaner district